Peter Graham Hogben  (5 July 192526 November 2011)  was Archdeacon of Dorking from 1982 until 1990.

Biography
Hogben was educated at The Harvey Grammar School and left school to commence wartime service with the Royal Engineers. When peace returned he worked for two firms of agricultural auctioneers (in Kent and in Hertfordshire).

He was ordained in 1961 and was Curate at St John, Hale, Surrey from 1961 to 1964. He was Vicar of Westborough, Guildford from 1964 to 1971; and Vicar of Ewell before his appointment as Archdeacon from 1982 until his retirement eight year later.

References

1925 births
2011 deaths
People educated at The Harvey Grammar School
Royal Engineers officers
Alumni of Bishops' College, Cheshunt
Archdeacons of Dorking